Artūras Steško (born 25 March 1976) is a Lithuanian footballer who plays for FK Žalgiris Vilnius.

Steško previously played for Widzew Łódź in the Polish Ekstraklasa.

Steško has made five appearances for the Lithuania national football team.

References

External links

1976 births
Living people
Lithuanian footballers
Lithuania international footballers
Ekstraklasa players
FK Žalgiris players
Widzew Łódź players
Expatriate footballers in Poland
Lithuanian expatriate sportspeople in Poland
Twin sportspeople
Association football midfielders
Lithuanian expatriate sportspeople in Germany
Expatriate footballers in Germany